Do Aankhen is a 1974 Bollywood drama film directed by Ajoy Biswas. The film stars Rekha.

Cast
Rekha   
Biswajeet   
Deb Mukherjee   
Kumari Naaz   
Jankidas   
I. S. Johar   
Ashok Kumar

Music
Songs in the film were composed by music director Chitragupta and the lyrics were written by Verma Malik.

External links
 

1974 films
1970s Hindi-language films
1974 drama films
Indian drama films
Hindi-language drama films